Vidra is a commune in the south of Ilfov County, Muntenia, Romania. Its name means "otter". It is composed of three villages: Crețești, Sintești and Vidra.

Natives
 Spiridon Niculescu

References

Communes in Ilfov County
Localities in Muntenia